Vilavoorkkal is a Census Town city in district of Thiruvananthapuram, Kerala. The Vilavoorkkal Census Town has population of 31,761 of which 15,647 are males while 16,114 are females as per report released by Census India 2011.Vilavoorkkal  used to be a village in Thiruvananthapuram district in the state of Kerala, India but was upgraded to census town after reclassification.

Demographics
The population of children aged between 0-6 in Vilavoorkkal is 2674, which is 8.42 % of total population. In the Vilavoorkkal Town Census, Female Sex Ratio is of 1030 against state average of 1084. Moreover Child Sex Ratio in Vilavoorkkal is around 958 compared to Kerala state average of 964. Literacy rate of Vilavoorkkal city is 93.50 % lower than state average of 94.00 %. In Vilavoorkkal, male literacy is around 95.19 % while the female literacy rate is 91.86 %.

References

 Census 2001 Demographic Data
 Census 2011 Demographic Data

Villages in Thiruvananthapuram district